Xanthophyllum pseudoadenotus is a plant in the family Polygalaceae. The specific epithet  is from the Greek, referring to the plant's resemblance to X. adenotus.

Description
The flowers dry brownish orange.

Distribution and habitat
Xanthophyllum pseudoadenotus is endemic to Borneo. Its habitat is forest on stream banks, at around  altitude.

References

pseudoadenotus
Endemic flora of Borneo
Plants described in 1982